The first Dehradun Pride Parade was held on 30 July, 2017. The parade was organised by Prayojan Kalyan Samiti. Over 200 people took part in it. The march started at 3pm from Astley hall and participants walked around Parade Ground and Ghanta Ghar, before coming back to Astley Hall again at 5pm. The march was flagged off by Chandigarh based transgender activist Dhananjay Mangalmukhi. Slogans were raised against Section 377 of the Indian Penal Code at the march.

Dehradun organized its second pride on August 25, 2019. The pride was organized by Queer Collective Dehradun in association with Indian Queer Observer, Prayojan Kalyan Samiti and supported by Humsafar Trust. The events saw many participants both from in and out of the city. The pride started from Parade ground at 2:30 pm and went for a few hours.

References 

LGBT rights in India
Pride parades in India
2017 establishments in Uttarakhand
Recurring events established in 2017
Dehradun